Greek Slave may refer to:
A Greek Slave, late 19th-century musical
The Greek Slave, mid 19th-century statue
Slavery in ancient Greece